Charas ( Marijuana) is a 1976 Indian Hindi-language action thriller film produced and directed by Ramanand Sagar. It is set against the backdrop of the expulsion of Indian community from Uganda by its dictator Idi Amin in 1972. The film stars Dharmendra, Hema Malini, Ajit, Amjad Khan, Sujit Kumar, Aruna Irani,   Asrani, Keshto Mukherjee and Tom Alter. The film's music is by Laxmikant–Pyarelal.

Cast

Dharmendra	...	Suraj Kumar
Hema Malini...	Sudha
Ajit	...	Kalicharan
Amjad Khan ...	Robert
Aruna Irani...	Nimmu
Nazir Hussain... Seth Vrindavan
Manmohan Krishna...Sudha's Father
Asrani	...	Police Inspector Rustom
Keshto Mukherjee...Police Inspector Golmes 
Sujit Kumar...	Lawrence / Shaikh Abdul Sattar
Paidi Jairaj...	Police Officer Hameed (as P. Jairaj)
D.K. Sapru	...	Watson (as Sapru)
Sajjan...	Jango
Viju Khote ... No 10, Henchman of Kalicharan 
Sailesh Kumar		
Madhumati (actress)...	Laila
Agha.... Head Police Constable, special appearance 
Sunder...Police Constable Pandu, special appearance

Plot
Vijay Ramniklal was a NRI living in Uganda with his son Suraj and daughter Radha. They are planning to move back to India because of the civil war in the country. The night they were about to move, their home is attacked by rebels and set on fire.  Suraj jumps in the fire to save his sister. He carries a woman out, but she turns out to be the housemaid in his sister's clothes (Radha asked the maid to choose the clothes she liked before she left and the maid asked her for the clothes she was wearing).  Suraj's father dies from the trauma of losing his daughter. Suraj too believes that Radha burned with the house, but when no body is found he feels that there is something fishy. Nevertheless, he leaves for India alone as the country is embroiled in civil war.

Upon reaching India Suraj realises that the caretaker of their property Kalicharan, has sold most of it and is not willing to return it while using it for illegal purposes. Kalicharan tries to kill Suraj who, while escaping from his enemies, hides in the car of Sudha. After a gruesome car chase, the goons of Kalicharan are chased off by an unknown man. The person claims to be a rival mafia don to Kalicharan and invites Suraj to join his gang in order to regain his ancestral property and find his sister Radha. Suraj declines, saying he would rather suffer all his life than to become a criminal. Sudha takes him to his home and he contacts the police. It is revealed that the person who claimed to be a mafia don was actually a police officer. Suraj is invited by DIG Police to join them in combating Kalicharan's international drug racket.

Sudha, a renowned dancer and stage performer, has a shady past. She is blackmailed by Kalicharan who frames her as a murder suspect. He uses her to smuggle drugs.

Suraj's mission takes him to Rome and then Malta where he again bumps into Sudha. His sister is in the same island, held captive by human traffickers associated with Kalicharan. Suraj rescues her when they try to capture him using her as bait. With the help of local police, Suraj and Indian narcotics division is able to get hold of most of Kalicharan's men, but he holds Sudha as a hostage in his Bond villain style underground lair. Now it all lies in Suraj's hands to save Sudha and book Kalicharan.

Soundtrack
The soundtrack of the film is composed by the duo of Laxmikant–Pyarelal and the lyrics were written by the veteran lyricist Anand Bakshi.

Track listing

External links
 

1976 films
1970s Hindi-language films
Films scored by Laxmikant–Pyarelal
Films directed by Ramanand Sagar
Films about the illegal drug trade
Indian films about cannabis
Films about the Narcotics Control Bureau